The One Divides into Two controversy was an ideological debate about the nature of contradiction that took place in China in 1964. The concept originated in Lenin's Philosophical Notebooks. The philosopher Yang Xianzhen originated the idea of "Two Unites into One", which he said was the primary law of dialectics. The Maoists interpreted this to mean that capitalism could be united with socialism. Ai Siqi wrote the original attack on Yang, and was joined by Mao himself. Wang Ruoshui also contributed to the attack.  After 1976, Yang was officially rehabilitated, along with the concept of two uniting into one.

This phrase is derived from the formulation given by Vladimir Lenin in his Philosophical Notebooks; "The splitting of a single whole and the cognition of its contradictory parts ... is the essence ... of dialectics."

Richard Baum has put the controversy in terms of modern game theory as a debate between zero sum and non-zero sum competition.  

Alain Badiou, during his Maoist phase, would use the principle of One Divides into Two to criticize the philosophy of Gilles Deleuze.

See also
 Antagonistic contradiction
 On Contradiction

References

External links
 Chinese Communist Party: Theory of "Combine Two into One" is a Reactionary Philosophy

Cultural Revolution
Campaigns of the Chinese Communist Party
Concepts in political philosophy
Maoist terminology
Ideology of the Chinese Communist Party